Antony Santos a.k.a. El Mayimbe, now Anthony Santos, (born 5 May 1967) is a Dominican musician and singer. He is one of the top-selling Bachata artists of all time. He is known as one of the pioneers of modern Bachata in the early 1990s with his role in redefining the genre to include romantic lyrics, poppy guitar licks, and implementation of new instruments such as the piano and saxophone.

Early life 
Santos was born in 1967 in Clavellinas, Las Matas de Santa Cruz in the Monte Cristi province. He grew up extremely poor in a little house on a farm land. His father worked many meaningless jobs for basically nothing, and the family would go without food due to having little to no income.

Career 
Santos entered onto the bachata scene in the early 1990s, beginning his career as the guira player for fellow bachatero Luis Vargas, only to leave the group and maintain a very public feud with Vargas. Raulín Rodríguez also started his music career with Antony as a guira player. Although Blas Durán is credited as the first bachatero to use an electric guitar, and Luis is credited as the first bachata guitarist to use guitar pedals, Anthony was the one who defined the sound of modern bachata. He did this through his use of an Alvarez 5084N guitar, with a humbucker mounted in the soundhole, and an Ibanez PT4 pedal. He is also credited as one of the first to use Yamaha APX series of guitars in bachata.

Santos became the first rural bachatero to reach a mainstream audience, with his hit "Voy Pa'llá". Santos adoption of soft romantic lyrics was more socially accepted than the bawdy style common to bachata before him, and he shortly became the genre's leading artist, helping move bachata into the mainstream. He is known as El Mayimbe de la Bachata, being that Fernando Villalona already had that name way before Santos. He is also known as El Bachatú, which is the nickname he originally started with. Santos is not only one of the biggest names in bachata music, but has served as an inspiration to many bachata artists and musicians such as Romeo Santos and Lenny Santos. He has performed various songs with Aventura and with Romeo. Hits include "Ciego de Amor", "Debate de 4" alongside Luis Vargas and Raulín Rodríguez, "Masoquismo", and "Bellas", which were included in Antony's Album La Historia De Mi Vida: El Final, Vol 1 (2018), and Romeo's album Utopía (2019). One of his most famous songs,"Muchos Cambios En El Mundo" (Many Changes in the World), is a bachata cover of the song Algo Grande Viene a la Tierra by the evangelical pastor Stanislao Marino. He has also sang alongside Prince Royce with the song Que Cosas Tiene El Amor.

Discography

Studio albums 

 La Chupadera (1991)
 La Batalla (1992)
 Corazón Bonito (1993)
 Cojelo Ahí (1994)
 El Mayimbe... y Nada Más (1995)
 Sabor Latino (1996)
 Como Te Voy a Dejar (1997)
 Me Muero de Amor (1998)
 Enamorado (1999)
 El Balazo (2001)
 Juego de Amor (2002)
 Sin Ti (2003)
 Vuelve Amor (Grabado En Vivo) (2004)
 Lloro (2005)
 Ay! Ven (2006)
 No Nos Vamos A Olvidar (2007)
 Muchos Cambios En El Mundo (2008)
 Vete (2008)
 Un Muerto Vivo (2009)
 Mensaje (2010)
 Vuelve (2011)
 Creíste (2014)
 Tócame (2015)
 La Historia De Mi Vida: El Final, Vol. 1 (2018)

Live albums 

 El Mayimbe: En Vivo (1999)
 El Mayimbe, En Vivo: Vol. 2 (2002)
 En Vivo, Vol. 3: Con Su Nuevo Estilo (2003)
 Concierto, En Vivo: United Palace (2005)
 Me Van A Matar Por Las Mujeres (2006)
 En Vivo – Sold out at Madison Square Garden (2014)

Compilation albums 

 Grandes Éxitos (2000)
 Greatest Hits (2001)
 Todo Éxitos (2002)
 Lo Nuevo y Lo Mejor (2005)
 Siempre Romantico (2006)
 El Diablo Soy Yo (2011)
 25 Grandes Éxitos (2014)

Films 
 Anthony Santos: Documentary by Frédéric Pelle (1996)
 Concierto, En Vivo: United Palace (Limited Edition) (2005)
 El Mayimbe En Vivo (2006)

References 

Living people
Bachata musicians
21st-century Dominican Republic male singers
1967 births
Dominican Republic songwriters
Male songwriters
Spanish-language singers
Bachata singers